Minister of the Department of Transportation and Infrastructure.

Since 2012, the Department of Transportation and the infrastructure management components of the Department of Supply and Services (the successor to the Department of Public Works) are merged back together which gave the charges of the minister of the department of Public Works back to the minister of transportation.

2012-present

* Williams served as Minister of Transportation and Minister of Supply and Services styled as Minister of Transportation of Infrastructure from October 12, 2010 and the formal establishment of the Department of Transportation and Infrastructure on March 15, 2012.

1967-2012

See Department of Transportation (New Brunswick) and Department of Supply and Services (New Brunswick).

1856-1967

References

Government of New Brunswick